Akhil Rabindra is an Indian racing driver and a graduate from the University of Edinburgh, Scotland. For the 2019 Season, Akhil Rabindra is selected as the Aston Martin Racing Academy Driver  and will be racing in the GT4 European Series and will drive an Aston Martin Vantage GT4 for PROsport Performance and Rabindra teamed up with 23-year-old Swiss racer Florian Thoma. The 2019 GT4 European Series began at Autodromo Nazionale Monza Italy on 12–14 April where Akhil finished 8th and 7th in 2 races securing 10 points. Akhil with his team PROsport Performance achieved the first podium for the New Aston Martin Vantage GT4 by finishing 2nd in the 2019 24H GT Series European held at Mugello Circuit Italy on 29 to 30 March 2019, Won in the 2019 24H GT Series European at Circuit de Spa-Francorchamps Belgium on 19 to 20 April 2nd in the Race-1 at the GT4 European Series held at Brands Hatch UK on 4 to 5 May 2019 and 3rd in the GT4 class at 2019 24H GT Series European held at Brno Circuit Czech Republic on 24 to 25 May.

Akhil Rabindra has been selected by Blackbirds Hyderabad for the Inaugural Season of the X1 Racing League

Akhil Rabindra is among 12 drivers to be retained by the Aston Martin Racing Driver Academy for the 2020 season.
 
Further, Akhil debuted in the International Motor Sports Association 2019 Michelin Pilot Challenge held at Road America, United States on 2 to 4 August and the next round held at Virginia International Raceway, on 23 to 25 August. Akhil Rabindra and teammate Ross Gunn raced to a sixth-place finish at Virginia International Raceway for Stoner Car Care on Saturday in the Automatic Racing-prepared No. 09 Stoner Car Care Aston Martin GT4. The results mark the team's best finish of the year as the squad continues to learn more each time out with the all-new Aston Martin Vantage GT4 platform.

In the 2018 Season, Akhil Rabindra joined the French Team 3Y Technology to drive in the GT4 European Series in BMW M4 GT4 Car in the silver class alongside Belgian driver Stephene Leveret and finished 18th in the silver category with a best finish of 4th in Race-3 and a top 10 result in the French GT4 round in Spain. Rabindra had also participated in the 2018 24H TCE Series, 24-hour Silverstone 2018 with team Excelr8 Motorsport.

In the year 2017, he was selected by the McLaren GT Driver Academy to race in the British GT Championship with team Black Bull Garage 59. He secured a credible 7th in silver category, in his debut 2017 British GT Championship held at Oulton Park, UK.

Rabindra previously competed in single-seater championships such as the 2016 BRDC British Formula-3 Championship with team Lanan Racing, the BRDC Formula 4 Championship 2015 in the United Kingdom. Rabindra was the Winner of FIA Institute Young Driver Excellence Award 2014, Vice Champion in JK Tyre National Racing Championship 2014, Winner Toyota Etios Colombo Night Race 2013, and the Vice Champion in Toyota Etios Motor Racing (EMR) 2013. Along with racing on track, Akhil is also associated with the Sean Edwards Foundation where he is a safety ambassador.

Career
Rabindra started his motorsports career by racing in National Go Karting Championship and Formula LGB Swift in India. In 2017 he switched from single-seater to GT sports cars. He was selected by the McLaren GT Driver Academy to race in the British GT Championship He secured a credible seventh in silver category, in his debut British GT Championship held at Oulton Park, UK. This was Rabindra's debut in the British GT Series and, with his teammate Dean MacDonald, finished the series in 13th overall. Their team Black Bull Garage 59 stood 2nd overall in the series.

Rabindra started his motorsports career by racing in National Go Karting Championship and Formula LGB Swift in India and by winning the JK Tyres MMS Rotax Max National Rookie Championship 2011, in the same year he also was crowned the Vice Championship of Amaron National Karting Challenge along with Red Bull Kart Fight as Champion. Akhil made his Racing debut in 2012 with JK Tyre National Racing Championship in the LGB Formula-Swift, the entry-level single-seater series. In the same year Rabindra also made two guest appearances in the JK Racing Asia Series finishing a creditable 7th in 3 of the races.

In 2012 Rabindra alongside racing in Single seater car, debuted in touring cars driving the Toyota Ethios Racing Series, and was the youngest finalist in the saloon car category in the championship and managed a podium finish at the Exhibition Race in Chennai and a strong finish in the race of Champions in Delhi ensuring his place at the Columbia Night Race 2013 He was titled Vice Champion in the Toyota Etios Motor Racing 2013. Rabindra won the event from Pole position and was crowned Columbo Night Race Champion.

In 2014 Rabindra was nominated by the FMSCI to represent India for the FIA Institute Young Drivers Excellence Academy, where he won his place for the Asia-Pacific region.

2014 saw Akhil competing in the JK Tyre National Racing Championship driving the ex-Formula BMW cars previously raced by the likes of Sebastian Vettal, Nico Rosberg, Daniel Riccardo, Sebastien Buemi and many more. Rabindra gained 9 podium places in the 4 rounds and emerged as the runner-up. Rabindra also raced in a limited programme in the Formula Masters China Series driving the more powerful Tatuus FA010 chassis with a 2.0 Formula engine providing 180 HP with a best finish of 4th.

In 2015, Rabindra competed in BRDC Formula 4 Championship in the United Kingdom with Wayne Douglas Motorsport, a series for young drivers from all over the world driving the new MSV F4-013, 2-litre Ford Durance engine and paddle shift gearbox. Having to learn a new car and new tracks Rabindra scored 203 points finishing 14th overall. Along with his main programme in BRDC F4 Rabindra also raced in the JK Tyre National Racing Championship.

2016 saw a step up to 2016 BRDC British Formula 3 Championship with the Championship winning team Lanan racing driving the all new Tatuus chassis with adjustable aerodynamics, F1 style splitters and powered by a 2-litre 230 bhp spec Cos worth engine, competing against other young drivers on F1 circuits such as Spa Francorchamps and Silverstone. Rabindra scored 124 points, finishing the series in 18th place overall.

For 2017 Akhil Rabindra was selected for the McLaren GT Driver Academy, the academy had chosen the Indian racer Akhil Rabindra along with 7 other drivers from across the world. Rabindra secured a credible third in silver category, in his debut British GT Championship held at Oulton Park, UK. This was Rabindra's debut in the British GT series and he drove along with his teammate Dean Macdonald. They finished the series with 7th in silver category. Their team Black Bull Garage 59 stood 2nd overall in the series.

Akhil Rabindra, for the 2018 Season had teamed up with French Team 3Y Technology to drive in the prestigious GT4 European Series in BMW M4 GT4 Car in the silver class alongside the experienced Belgian driver Stephene Leveret and finished a credible 18th in the silver category with a best finish of 4th in Race-3 and a top-10 result in the French GT4 round in Spain. The season began on 6 April 2018 at Zolder and ended on 16 September 2018 at Nürburgring. The Team finished 12th with 147 points. Akhil had also participated in the 24H Series, 24 hours Silverstone 2018 with team Excelr8 Motorsport.

Racing Record

Career Summary

References

External links
 
 

1996 births
Living people
Sportspeople from Bangalore
Indian racing drivers
Formula Masters China drivers
BRDC British Formula 3 Championship drivers
24H Series drivers
British GT Championship drivers
Aston Martin Racing drivers
JK Tyre National Level Racing Championship drivers
Michelin Pilot Challenge drivers
GT4 European Series drivers